Milan Svoboda (22 August 1939 - 22 July 2004 in Prague) was a Czechoslovak slalom canoeist who competed in the late 1960s and the early 1970s. He won four medals at the ICF Canoe Slalom World Championships with three golds (Mixed C-2: 1967, 1969; Mixed C-2 team: 1969) and a silver (Mixed C-2: 1971).

References

Czechoslovak male canoeists
1939 births
2004 deaths
Medalists at the ICF Canoe Slalom World Championships
Canoeists from Prague